Great Central Station, also known as Great Central Depot, was an intercity train station in Chicago, Illinois, owned by the Illinois Central Railroad (IC). It opened in 1856 and for a time was the largest building in downtown Chicago. Its passenger depot building was located on Water Street. The IC had its headquarters in offices above the depot , while beyond the depot was the large rail house where eight track lines ran. It was damaged in the Great Chicago Fire of 1871 but remained in operation. 

The station proved inadequate to handle growing traffic and its original building was demolished in 1893 in favor of the new Central Station at the southern end of Grant Park. Although it continued to receive some traffic, over time it increasingly became a commuter rail depot. Millennium Station, formerly Randolph Street Terminal, sits on the location.

Design 
The station was designed by Otto H. Matz and included both a head house and a train shed. The most distinctive feature of the train shed was the three masonry arches fronting the wooden structure. Architectural historian Carroll Meeks criticized the front of the head house, calling it an "ill-assorted complex of disparate elements." Carl W. Condit cited the design as an example of vernacular architecture.

Only Birmingham New Street railway station had a wider roof. On its completion the station was the largest building in Chicago. In 1871, the Great Chicago Fire destroyed the train shed, which was never rebuilt. A subsequent fire in 1874 damaged the head house.

Services 
Great Central Station officially opened on June 1, 1856. It was the Illinois Central's first permanent station in Chicago and cost . The Great Central originally served the Illinois Central, Michigan Central, Burlington Route, and Galena and Chicago Union (a predecessor to the Chicago and North Western). The G&CU was a tenant for less than a year, while the Burlington moved to the new Union Depot (predecessor to today's Union Station) in 1881. Predecessors of the Cleveland, Cincinnati, Chicago and St. Louis Railway (the "Big Four") reached the depot in 1872 via trackage rights from Kankakee. The depot was used until 1893.

Traffic peaked at 100 intercity passenger trains per day in the early 1890s, not including suburban (what would now be called commuter) trains. The Illinois Central constructed a new facility, Central Station, to meet the traffic demands of the World's Columbian Exposition. That station opened on April 17, 1893, and Great Central was demolished. Suburban trains continued to stop north of Central Station where Millennium Station now stands.

Notes

References 

Former railway stations in Illinois
Railway stations in Chicago
Demolished railway stations in the United States
Railway stations in the United States opened in 1856
Railway stations closed in 1893
Former Illinois Central Railroad stations